Vasanti N. Bhat-Nayak was a mathematician whose research concerned balanced incomplete block designs, bivariegated graphs, graceful graphs, graph equations and frequency partitions.
She earned a Ph.D. from the University of Mumbai in 1970 with the dissertation Some New Results in PBIBD Designs and Combinatorics. S. S. Shrikhande was her advisor.
After completing her doctorate, she remained on the faculty at the university, and eventually served as department head.

References

Indian combinatorialists
University of Mumbai alumni
Academic staff of the University of Mumbai
Scientists from Mumbai
Konkani people
20th-century Indian mathematicians
Indian women mathematicians
20th-century Indian women scientists
20th-century women mathematicians